Tomáš Nekoranec (1985) is a Slovak professional ice hockey player.

He played with HC Slovan Bratislava in the Slovak Extraliga.

References

1985 births
Living people
HC Slovan Bratislava players
Slovak ice hockey players